Paul Brown (born July 21, 1984) is a Canadian retired professional ice hockey player.

Early life 
Brown was born in Edmonton. He played major junior hockey in the Western Hockey League (WHL) with the Regina Pats and Kamloops Blazers, scoring 48 goals and 79 assists for 127 points, while earning 782 penalty minutes in 229 games played.

Career 
He was selected by the Nashville Predators in the 3rd round (89th overall) of the 2003 NHL Entry Draft. Brown went on to play three seasons of professional hockey, mostly in the American Hockey League with the Milwaukee Admirals, before retiring following the 2006–07 season.

Career statistics

References

External links

1984 births
Living people
Canadian expatriate ice hockey players in the United States
Canadian ice hockey left wingers
Kamloops Blazers players
Milwaukee Admirals players
Nashville Predators draft picks
Regina Pats players
Rockford IceHogs (UHL) players
Ice hockey people from Edmonton
Trenton Titans players